Daisy and Violet Hilton (5 February 1908 – early January 1969) were English-born entertainers, who were conjoined twins. They were exhibited in Europe as children, and toured the United States sideshow, vaudeville and American burlesque circuits in the 1920s and 1930s. They were best known for their film appearances in Freaks and  the biographic Chained for Life (1951).

The twins were born at 18 Riley Road, Brighton, England, on 5 February 1908. Their mother was Kate Skinner, an unmarried barmaid. The sisters were born joined by their hips and buttocks; they shared blood circulation and were fused at the pelvis but shared no major organs. 

They were variously called or referred to as The Siamese Twins, The Hilton Sisters and The Brighton Twins or The Brighton Conjoined Twins and in the United States as the San Antonio Twins. The sisters performed alongside Bob Hope and Charlie Chaplin. After years of being managed professionally by their legal guardians, in the early 1930s, on the advice of Harry Houdini, they were legally emancipated.

Early life

A medical account of the birth and a description of the twins was provided for the British Medical Journal by physician James Augustus Rooth, who helped deliver them. He reported that subsequently the Sussex Medico-Chirurgical Society considered separation, but unanimously decided against it as it was believed that the operation would certainly lead to the death of one or both of the twins. He noted these twins were the first to be born in the UK conjoined and to survive for more than a few weeks.

Their mother was unmarried. Kate Skinner's employer, Mary Hilton, who helped in childbirth, apparently saw commercial prospects in them, and effectively bought them from their mother and took them under her care. The girls first stayed above the Queen's Arms pub in Brighton where they were exhibited. They later moved to the Evening Star pub. According to the sisters' autobiography, Mary Hilton with her husband and daughter strictly controlled the twins by means of physical abuse; they had to call her "Auntie Lou" and her husband "Sir". They trained the girls in singing and dancing.

Performing career

The Hilton sisters toured first in Britain in 1911 (aged 3) as "The United Twins". Mary Hilton took them on to a tour through Germany, then to Australia, then in 1916 to the US. In true sideshow manner, their performance was accompanied by an imaginative "history". Their controllers kept all the money the sisters earned. In 1926, Bob Hope formed an act called the Dancemedians with the sisters, who had a tap-dancing routine. When Mary died in Birmingham, Alabama, the girls were bequeathed to Mary's daughter Edith Meyers, and Edith's husband Meyer Meyers, a former balloon salesman.

The couple took over management of the twins. Held mostly captive, the girls were beaten if they did not do as the Meyerses wished. They kept the twins from public view for a while and trained them in jazz music. Violet was a skilled saxophonist and Daisy a violinist. They lived in a mansion in San Antonio, Texas.

In 1931, the sisters sued their managers and were legally emancipated, gaining freedom from their contract and awarded US$100,000 in damages (equivalent to $ in ). They went into vaudeville as "The Hilton Sisters' Revue". Daisy dyed her hair blonde and they began to wear different outfits so as to be distinguishable from Violet. After vaudeville lost popularity, the sisters performed at burlesque venues.

Shortly after gaining independence from the Meyerses, the Hiltons sailed to the UK on the Berengaria in December 1932. They spent most of 1933 in the UK and returned to the US in October 1933.

Violet began a relationship with musician Maurice Lambert, and they applied in 21 states for a marriage license, but it was always refused.

In 1932, the twins appeared in the film Freaks. Afterwards their popularity faded, and they struggled to make a living in show business.

Later life
In 1936 Violet married gay actor James Moore as a publicity stunt. The marriage lasted ten years on paper, but it was eventually annulled.  At the time of the wedding, Daisy was visibly pregnant. Her child was given up for adoption.  In 1941 Daisy married Harold Estep, better known as dancer Buddy Sawyer, who was also gay.  The marriage lasted ten days.
In 1952 they starred in a second film, Chained for Life, an exploitation film loosely based on their lives. Afterwards, they undertook personal appearances at double bill screenings of their two films.

The Hiltons' last public appearance was at a drive-in in 1961 in Charlotte, North Carolina. Their tour manager abandoned them there and, with no means of transportation or income, they were forced to take a job in a nearby grocery store, where they worked for the rest of their lives.

On January 4, 1969, after they failed to report to work, their boss called the police. The twins were found dead in their home, victims of the Hong Kong flu. According to a forensic investigation, Daisy died first; Violet died between two to four days later. They were buried in Forest Lawn West Cemetery in Charlotte.

Media legacy
In 1989 a musical based on the twins, Twenty Fingers Twenty Toes, with book by Michael Dansicker and Bob Nigro and music and lyrics by Michael Dansicker, premiered at the WPA Theatre and ran for 35 performances. The script can be found in the New York Public Library for the Performing Arts. It began as an accurate portrayal of the twins' early life, but then included a wholly fictitious plot by their keepers to have them surgically separated as adults. 

Side Show, a Broadway musical loosely based on the sisters' lives, with lyrics by Bill Russell and music by Henry Krieger, opened at the Richard Rodgers Theater on 16 October 1997. It starred Emily Skinner as Daisy and Alice Ripley as Violet, and received four Tony nominations, but closed after 91 performances. In 2014, a substantially rewritten version of the musical was mounted at the Kennedy Center and moved to Broadway, where it opened at the St. James Theater on 17 November 2014, starring Erin Davie as Violet and Emily Padgett as Daisy. Although well-reviewed, the revival closed on 4 January 2015.

In 2012, Leslie Zemeckis filmed a documentary, Bound by Flesh, about the sisters' lives. The Hollywood Reporter called it "scrupulously researched" and a "masterful film". The film won Best Documentary awards at both the 2012 Hollywood Film Festival and the 2013 Louisiana International Film Festival.

Other legacy

Brighton & Hove 708 (YP58 UGH), a 2009 Scania OmniCity DD bus that currently operates on the 27 (Westdene Park & Ride – Saltdean) in their home town, was named in their honour.

In May, 2018, it was announced that Brighton and Hove City Council and the current owner of the house in which the twins were born had agreed that a commemorative blue plaque could be erected at the property.

On 26 May 2022 a commemorative blue plaque was unveiled at 18 Riley Road, dedicated to Violet and Daisy Skinner: The Hilton Twins.

Filmography 
 Freaks (1932)
 Chained for Life (1952)

References

External links

 San Antonio Siamese Twins Have Unlike Finger Prints. Retrieved 9 December 2014.
Profile, hollywoodreporter.com. Retrieved 9 December 2014.
The sisters singing the song "Love Thief"

1908 births
1969 deaths
Conjoined twins
Sideshow performers
Vaudeville performers
English film actresses
English autobiographers
20th-century English actresses
Identical twin actresses
Deaths from influenza
Infectious disease deaths in North Carolina
People from Brighton
People from Charlotte, North Carolina
People from Miami
British expatriates in the United States
English twins
Women autobiographers